Sex reassignment therapy or medical transition is the medical aspect of gender transition, that is, modifying one's sex characteristics to better suit one's gender identity.  It can consist of hormone therapy to alter secondary sex characteristics, sex reassignment surgery to alter primary sex characteristics, and other procedures altering appearance, such as permanent hair removal for trans women.

In appropriately evaluated cases of severe gender dysphoria, sex reassignment therapy is often the best when standards of care are followed.  There is academic concern over the low quality of the evidence supporting the efficacy of sex reassignment therapy as treatment for gender dysphoria, but more robust studies are impractical to carry out; however, there exists a broad clinical consensus, supplementing the academic research, that supports the effectiveness in terms of subjective improvement of sex reassignment therapy in appropriately selected patients.  Treatment of gender dysphoria does not involve attempting to correct the patient's experience of gender identity, but to help the patient adapt.

Major health organizations in the United States and UK have issued affirmative statements supporting sex reassignment therapy as comprising medically necessary treatments in certain appropriately evaluated cases.

Eligibility
In the International Classification of Diseases, the diagnosis is known as transsexualism. The US Diagnostic and Statistical Manual of Mental Disorders (DSM) names it gender dysphoria (in version 5). Some people who are validly diagnosed have no desire for all or some parts of sex reassignment therapy, particularly genital reassignment surgery, and/or are not appropriate candidates for such treatment.

The general standard for diagnosing, as well as treating, gender dysphoria is outlined in the WPATH Standards of Care for the Health of Transsexual, Transgender, and Gender Nonconforming People. As of February 2014, the most recent version of the standards is Version 7. According to the standards of care, "gender dysphoria refers to discomfort or distress that is caused by a discrepancy between a person's gender identity and that person's sex assigned at birth (and the associated gender role and/or primary and secondary sex characteristics). Only some gender-nonconforming people experience gender dysphoria at some point in their lives". Gender nonconformity is not the same as gender dysphoria; nonconformity, according to the standards of care, is not a pathology and does not require medical treatment.

The informed consent model is an alternative to the standard WPATH approach which does not require a person seeking transition related medical treatment to undergo formal assessment of their mental health or gender dysphoria. Arguments in favor of this model describe required assessments as gatekeeping, dehumanizing, pathologizing, and reinforcing a reductive perception of transgender experiences. Informed consent approaches include conversations between the medical provider and person seeking care on the details of risks and outcomes, current understandings of scientific research, and how the provider can best assist the person in making decisions.

Local standards of care exist in many countries.

Eligibility for different stages of treatment

While a mental health assessment is required by the standards of care, psychotherapy is not an absolute requirement but is highly recommended.

Hormone replacement therapy is to be initiated from a qualified health professional. The general requirements, according to the WPATH standards, include:

 Persistent, well-documented gender dysphoria;
 Capacity to make a fully informed decision and to consent for treatment;
 Age of majority in a given country (however, the WPATH standards of care provide separate discussion of children and adolescents);
 If significant medical or mental health concerns are present, they must be reasonably well-controlled.

Often, at least a certain period of psychological counseling is required before initiating hormone replacement therapy, as is a period of living in the desired gender role, if possible, to ensure that they can psychologically function in that life-role. On the other hand, some clinics provide hormone therapy based on informed consent alone.

Eligibility of minors
While the WPATH standards of care generally require the patient to have reached the age of majority, they include a separate section devoted to children and adolescents.

Psychological treatment

According to the WPATH SOC v7, "Psychotherapy (individual, couple, family, or group) for purposes such as exploring gender identity, role, and expression; addressing the negative impact of gender dysphoria and stigma on mental health; alleviating internalized transphobia; enhancing
social and peer support; improving body image; or promoting resilience" is a treatment option.

Some transsexual people may suffer from co-morbid psychiatric conditions unrelated to their gender dysphoria.
In cases of comorbid psychopathology, the standards are to manage the psychopathology "prior to, or concurrent with, treatment of gender dysphoria".  Treatment may still be appropriate and necessary in cases of significant comorbid psychopathology, as cases have been reported in which the individual was both suffering from severe co-occurring psychopathology, and was a 'late-onset, gynephilic' trans woman, and yet experienced a long-term, positive outcome with hormonal and surgical gender transition.
The DSM-IV itself states that in rare instances, gender dysphoria may co-exist with schizophrenia, and that psychiatric disorders are not generally considered contraindications to sex reassignment therapy unless they are the primary cause of the patient's gender dysphoria.

Hormone therapy

For trans people, hormone therapy causes the development of many of the secondary sexual characteristics of their desired sex. However, many of the existing primary and secondary sexual characteristics cannot be reversed by hormone therapy. For example, hormone therapy can induce breast growth for trans women but can only minimally reduce breasts for trans men. HRT can prompt facial hair growth for transgender men, but cannot regress facial hair for transgender women. Hormone therapy may, however, reverse some characteristics, such as distribution of body fat and muscle, as well as menstruation in trans men.

Generally, those traits that are easily reversible will revert upon cessation of hormonal treatment, unless chemical or surgical castration has occurred, though for many trans people, surgery is required to obtain satisfactory physical characteristics. But in trans men, some hormonally-induced changes may become virtually irreversible within weeks, whereas trans women usually have to take hormones for many months before any irreversible changes will result.

As with all medical activities, health risks are associated with hormone replacement therapy, especially when high hormone doses are taken as is common for pre-operative or no-operative trans patients. It is always advised that all changes in therapeutic hormonal treatment should be supervised by a physician because starting, stopping or even changing dosage rates and levels can have physical and psychological health risks.

Although some trans women use herbal phytoestrogens as alternatives to pharmaceutical estrogens, little research has been performed with regards to the safety or effectiveness of such products. Anecdotal evidence suggests that the results of herbal treatments are minimal and very subtle, if at all noticeable, when compared to conventional hormone therapy.

Some trans people are able to avoid the medical community's requirements for hormone therapy altogether by either obtaining hormones from black market sources, such as internet pharmacies which ship from overseas, or more rarely, by synthesizing hormones themselves.

Medications 
Testosterone therapy is typically used for masculinizing treatments. Effects can include thicker vocal cords, increased muscle mass, hair loss, and thicker skin. Intramuscular, subcutaneous, and transdermal options are available. These include cypionate (Depo-Testosterone®), and the longer acting testosterone undecanoate (Aveed®). Oral formulations are available in Europe, Andriol®, but are not available in the U.S. due to their pharmacokinetic properties.

Estrogen and anti-androgen therapy are typically used for feminizing treatments. Estrogen is available in oral, parenteral, and transdermal formulations. Often, estrogen alone is insufficient for androgen suppression, and appropriate therapy will call for additional anti-androgen medications. Anti-androgen medications include progesterone, medroxyprogesterone acetate, spironolactone, and finasteride.

Gender-affirming surgery 

Gender-affirming surgery refers to the surgical and medical procedures undertaken to align intersex and transsexual individuals' physical appearance and genital anatomy with their gender identity. Gender-affirming surgery may encompass any surgical procedures which will reshape a male body into a body with a female appearance or vice versa, or more specifically refer to the procedures used to make male genitals into female genitals and vice versa.

Other common terms used for gender-affirming surgery include "sex reassignment surgery" and "gender confirmation surgery". These terms may also specifically refer to genital surgeries like vaginoplasty, metoidioplasty, and phalloplasty, even though more specific terms exist to refer exclusively to genital surgery, the most common of which is genital reassignment surgery (GRS). The term "genital reconstruction surgery" may also be used.

Chest surgery

Many trans men seek mastectomy and male chest reconstruction. 

Breast augmentations for trans women are done in a similar manner to those for cisgender women.

Effectiveness

The Merck Manual states, in regard to trans women, "In follow-up studies, genital surgery has helped some transsexual people live happier and more productive lives and so is justified in highly motivated, appropriately assessed and treated transsexual people, who have completed a 1- to 2-year real-life experience in a different gender role.  Before surgery, transsexual people often need assistance with passing in public, including help with gestures and voice modulation.  Participation in support groups, available in most large cities, is usually helpful."  With regards to trans men, it states, "Surgery may help certain [trans men] patients achieve greater adaptation and life satisfaction.  Similar to trans women, trans men should live in the male gender role for at least 1 yr before surgery.  Anatomic results of neophallus surgical procedures are often less satisfactory in terms of function and appearance than neovaginal procedures for trans women.  Complications are common, especially in procedures that involve extending the urethra into the neophallus."

Kaplan and Sadock's Comprehensive Textbook of Psychiatry states, with regards to adults, "When patient gender dysphoria is severe and intractable, sex reassignment is often the best solution."  Regret tends to occur in cases of misdiagnosis, no real-life experience, and poor surgical results.  Risk factors for return to original gender role include history of transvestic fetishism, psychological instability, and social isolation.  In adolescents, careful diagnosis and following strict criteria can ensure good post-operative outcomes.  Many prepubescent children with cross-gender identities do not persist with gender dysphoria. With regards to follow-up, it states that "Clinicians are less likely to report poor outcomes in their patients, thus shifting the reporting bias to positive results.  However, some successful patients who wish to blend into the community as men or women do not make themselves available for follow-up.  Also, some patients who are not happy with their reassignment may be more known to clinicians as they continue clinical contact."

A 2009 systematic review looking at individual surgical procedures found that "[t]he evidence concerning gender reassignment surgery has several limitations in terms of: (a) lack of controlled studies, (b) evidence has not collected data prospectively, (c) high loss to follow up and (d) lack of validated assessment measures. Some satisfactory outcomes were reported, but the magnitude of benefit and harm for individual surgical procedures cannot be estimated accurately using the current available evidence."

A 2010 meta-analysis of follow-up studies reported "Pooling across studies shows that after sex reassignment, 80% of individuals with GID reported significant improvement in gender dysphoria (95% CI = 68–89%; 8 studies; I2 = 82%); 78% reported significant improvement in psychological symptoms (95% CI = 56–94%; 7 studies; I2 = 86%); 80% reported significant improvement in quality of life (95% CI = 72–88%; 16 studies; I2 = 78%); and 72% reported significant improvement in sexual function (95% CI = 60–81%; 15 studies; I2 = 78%)." The study concluded "Very low quality evidence suggests that sex reassignment that includes hormonal interventions in individuals with GID likely improves gender dysphoria, psychological functioning and comorbidities, sexual function and overall quality of life."

A study evaluating quality of life in female-to-male transgender individuals found "statistically significant (p<0.01) diminished quality of life among the FTM transgender participants as compared to the US male and female population, particularly in regard to mental health. FTM transgender participants who received testosterone (67%) reported statistically significant higher quality of life scores (p<0.01) than those who had not received hormone therapy."

A recent Swedish study (2010) found that “almost all patients were satisfied with sex reassignment at 5 years, and 86% were assessed by clinicians at follow-up as stable or improved in global functioning”  A prospective study in the Netherlands that looked at the psychological and sexual functioning of 162 adult applicants of adult sex reassignment applicants before and after hormonal and surgical treatment found, "After treatment the group was no longer gender dysphoric. The vast majority functioned quite well psychologically, socially and sexually. Two non-homosexual male-to-female transsexuals expressed regrets."

A long-term follow-up study performed in Sweden over a long period of time (1973–2003) found that morbidity, suicidality, and mortality in post-operative trans people were still significantly higher than in the general population, suggesting that sex reassignment therapy is not enough to treat gender dysphoria, highlighting the need for improved health care following sex reassignment surgery.  10 controls were selected for each post-operative trans person, matched by birth year and sex; two control groups were used: one matching sex at birth, the other matching reassigned sex.  The study states that "no inferences can be drawn [from this study] as to the effectiveness of sex reassignment as a treatment for transsexualism," citing studies showing the effectiveness of sex reassignment therapy, though noting their poor quality.  The authors noted that the results suggested that those who received sex reassignment surgery before 1989 had worse mortality, suicidality, and crime rates than those who received surgery on or after 1989: mortality, suicidality, and crime rates for the 1989-2003 cohort were not statistically significant compared to healthy controls (though psychiatric morbidity was); it is not clear if this is because these negative factors tended to increase a decade after surgery or because in the 1990s and later improved treatment and social attitudes may have led to better outcomes.

The American Psychiatric Association Task Force on GID's report from 2012 states, "The quality of evidence pertaining to most aspects of treatment in all subgroups was determined to be low; however, areas of broad clinical consensus were identified and were deemed sufficient to support recommendations for treatment in all subgroups."  The APA Task Force states, with regard to the quality of studies, "For some important aspects of transgender care, it would be impossible or unwise to engage in more robust study designs due to ethical concerns and lack of volunteer enrollment.  For example, it would be extremely problematic to include a 'long-term placebo treated control group' in an RCT of hormone therapy efficacy among gender variant adults desiring to use hormonal treatments."  The Royal College of Psychiatrists concurs with regards to SRS in trans women, stating, "There is no level 1 or 2 evidence (Oxford levels) supporting the use of feminising vaginoplasty in women but this is to be expected since a randomised controlled study for this scenario would be impossible to carry out."

Following up on the APA Task Force's report, the APA issued a statement stating that the APA recognizes that in "appropriately evaluated" cases, hormonal and surgical interventions may be medically necessary and opposes "categorical exclusions" of such treatment by third-party payers.  The American Medical Association's Resolution 122 states, "An established body of medical research demonstrates the effectiveness and medical necessity of mental health care, hormone therapy and sex reassignment surgery as forms of therapeutic treatment for many people diagnosed with GID".

The need for treatment is emphasized by the higher rate of mental health problems, including depression, anxiety, and various addictions, as well as a higher suicide rate among untreated transsexual people than in the general population. Many of these problems, in the majority of cases, disappear or decrease significantly after a change of gender role and/or physical characteristics.

In 2021, a review published in Plastic And Reconstructive Surgery found that less than 1% of people who undergo gender-affirming surgery regret the decision, although the authors said more research was needed, as the pool of sources was heterogeneous and many were viewed at "medium-to-high" risk of bias.

Ethical, cultural, and political considerations
Sex reassignment therapy is a controversial ethical subject. Notably, the Roman Catholic church, according to an unpublished Vatican document, holds that changing sex is not possible and, while in some cases treatment might be necessary, it does not change the person's sex in the eyes of the church. Some Catholic ethicists go further, proclaiming that a "sex change operation" is "mutilation" and therefore immoral.

Paul R. McHugh is a well-known opponent of sex reassignment therapy. According to his own article, when he joined Johns Hopkins University as director of the Department of Psychiatry and Behavioral Science, it was part of his intention to end sex reassignment surgery there. McHugh succeeded in ending it at the university during his time. However, a new gender clinic at Johns Hopkins has been opened in 2017.

Opposition was also expressed by several writers identifying as feminist, most famously Janice Raymond. Her paper was allegedly instrumental in removing Medicaid and Medicare support for sex reassignment therapy in the US.

Sex reassignment therapy, especially surgery, tends to be expensive and is not always covered by public or private health insurance. In many areas with comprehensive nationalized health care, such as some Canadian provinces and most European countries, SRT is covered under these plans. However, requirements for obtaining SRS and other transsexual services under these plans are sometimes more stringent than the requirements laid out in the WPATH Standards of Care for the Health of Transsexual, Transgender, and Gender Nonconforming People, and in Europe, many local Standards of Care exist. In other countries, such as the United States, no national health plan exists and the majority of private insurance companies do not cover SRS. The government of Iran, however, pays for such surgery because it is believed to be valid under Shi'ite Belief.

A significant and growing political movement exists, pushing to redefine the standards of care, asserting that they do not acknowledge the rights of self-determination and control over one's body, and that they expect (and even in many ways require) a monolithic transsexual experience. In opposition to this movement is a group of transsexual persons and caregivers who assert that the SOC are in place to protect others from "making a mistake" and causing irreversible changes to their bodies that will later be regrettedthough few post-operative transsexuals believe that sexual reassignment surgery was a mistake for them.

The United States

From 1981 until 2014, the Centers for Medicare and Medicaid Services (CMS) categorically excluded coverage of sex reassignment surgery by Medicare in its National Coverage Determination (NCD) "140.3 Transsexual Surgery," but that categorical exclusion came under challenge by an "aggrieved party" in an Acceptable NCD Complaint in 2013 and was subsequently struck down the following year by the Departmental Appeals Board (DAB), the administrative court of the U.S. Department of Health and Human Services (HHS).  In late 2013, the DAB issued a ruling finding the evidence on record was "not complete and adequate to support the validity of the NCD" and then moved on to discovery to determine if the exclusion was valid.  CMS did not defend its exclusion throughout the entire process.  On May 30, 2014, HHS announced that the categorical exclusion was found by the DAB to not be valid "under the 'reasonableness standard,'" allowing for Medicare coverage of sex reassignment surgery to be decided on a case-by-case basis.  HHS says it will move to implement the ruling. As Medicaid and private insurers often take their cues from Medicare on what to cover, this may lead to coverage of sex reassignment therapy by Medicaid and private insurers.  The evidence in the case "outweighs the NCD record and demonstrates that transsexual surgery is safe and effective and not experimental," according to the DAB in its 2014 ruling.

A 2014 article published in American Journal of Public Health called on third-party payers to cover sex reassignment therapy in appropriately selected cases.

Mandatory sterilization

In Sweden until 2012, sterilization was mandatory before sex reassignment in Sweden.

Consent and the treatment of intersex people

In 2011, Christiane Völling won the first successful case brought by an intersex person against a surgeon for non-consensual surgical intervention described by the International Commission of Jurists as "an example of an individual who was subjected to sex reassignment surgery without full knowledge or consent".

In 2015, the Council of Europe recognized, for the first time, a right for intersex persons to not undergo sex assignment treatment. In April 2015, Malta became the first country to recognize a right to bodily integrity and physical autonomy, and outlaw non-consensual modifications to sex characteristics. The Act was widely welcomed by civil society organizations.

See also

 List of transgender-related topics
 Sex assignment

References

Bibliography

 
 
 
 
 
 Pfäfflin, Friedemann & Astrid Junge -Sex Reassignment. Thirty Years of International Follow-up Studies After Sex Reassignment Surgery: A Comprehensive Review, 1961–1991 (translated from German into American English by Roberta B. Jacobson and Alf B. Meier)
 
 
 Xavier, J., Simmons, R. (2000) – The Washington transgender needs assessment survey, Washington, DC: The Administration for HIV and AIDS of the District of Columbia Government

Gender transitioning and medicine
Physical psychiatric treatments
Endocrine procedures
Sexual health
Surgical procedures and techniques